The Maryland Municipal League (MML) is a voluntary, nonprofit, nonpartisan group that  works to support and unite 157 municipal governments in the state of Maryland, as well as two special taxing districts through advocacy and leadership development. MML was founded in 1936 and is located in Annapolis, Maryland. As a member of the National League of Cities, the MML is able to offer legislative representation in Washington, D.C. and connections to other municipal governments throughout the United States.

In July 2020, the Maryland Municipal League announced that the Mayor of Salisbury, Maryland, Jake Day will serve as president of the league for the 2021–2022 term.

References

External links 
 Maryland Municipal League Official Website
 Maryland Municipal League records at the University of Maryland Libraries

Civic and political organizations of the United States